Capella Ecumenica Sanctæ Annæ in scopulis is a chapel in the archipelago of S:t Anna, in the province of Östergötland in Sweden.

The chapel on Västra Gärsholmen is the work of Hilding Bielkhammar, born in the parish of St Anna. As an 18-year-old boy he visited Stockholm 1925 to attend the big Ecumenical meeting, which was led by at that time archbishop Nathan Söderblom. At the meeting Hilding Bielkhammar heard the Lords Prayer being held in over 50 languages. It was at this time he got the idea to build an ecumenical centre in his home parish.

1958 Hilding started together with his family and friends to carry stones from the shores of the island to where the chapel would be. Without technical help he built metre thick walls and constructed a replica of St Anna old stone church which is from the 14th century. For the altar stones have been gathered from Old Swede's Church in Delaware, The Church of Laying Our Lady's Holy Robe in Kremlin, Moscow and the Lavra Monastery in Kyiv, Ukraine.

1965 The little chapel on Västra Gärsholmen was inaugurated on the holiday of Ascension day in by the Bishop Ragnar Askmark. From that day the chapel has been run by the order of Capella Ecumenica Sanctae Annae in scopulis.

The season starts as it always has been on the first Sunday in May and ends on the second Sunday in September. Every All Saints Day a special service is held in the memory of those who built the chapel. During the season services are held every Sunday and holiday at 11.00 am.

References

External links
 The Capella Ecumenica Homepage

Chapels in Sweden
20th-century churches in Sweden
Buildings and structures in Östergötland County
Churches completed in 1965